Rosewater is a 2014 American political drama film written, directed and produced by Jon Stewart, based on the memoir Then They Came for Me by Maziar Bahari and Aimee Molloy. It recounts Bahari's 2009 imprisonment by Iran, connected to an interview he participated in on The Daily Show that same year; Iranian authorities presented the interview as evidence that he was in communication with an American spy. Due to the content of the film, Stewart has been accused by Iran's state TV of being funded by Zionists and working with the CIA. The film was released in theaters on November 14, 2014.

The film received generally positive reviews for Bernal's performance, Stewart's direction, and its timely themes, but was criticized for its screenplay.

Plot
In 2009, London-based Iranian-Canadian journalist Maziar Bahari is detained in Iran after he reports on violence against protesters of the country's presidential election, as well as giving a satirical interview with Jason Jones of The Daily Show. While his pregnant fiancée  waits for him, Bahari spends 118 days at Evin Prison being brutally interrogated.

Bahari is usually blindfolded while being interrogated, and his interrogator's sole distinguishing feature is that he smells of rosewater.

Cast
 Gael García Bernal as Maziar Bahari, a journalist who was interrogated and tortured over 118 days in Iran
 Claire Foy as Paola Gourley 
 Kim Bodnia as "Rosewater"
 Haluk Bilginer as Baba Akbar
 Shohreh Aghdashloo as Moloojoon
 Dimitri Leonidas as Davood
 Golshifteh Farahani as Maryam
 Arian Moayed as Hamid
 Amir El-Masry as Alireza
 Jason Jones as himself

Production
Rosewater was filmed in Jordan, with footage from Iran, between June and mid-August 2013. It had a budget of $5–10 million.

Release
On July 31, 2014, it was announced that the film would be released on November 7, 2014. The film premiered at the Telluride Film Festival on August 29, 2014, and it was screened in the Special Presentations section of the 2014 Toronto International Film Festival in September 2014.

Reception

Box office
Rosewater grossed $3.2 million.

In its opening weekend, the film grossed $1.2 million from 371 theaters, finishing 13th at the box office.

Critical reception
Rosewater received mostly positive reviews from critics. On Rotten Tomatoes, the film holds a rating of 76%, based on 155 reviews, with an average rating of 6.7/10. The site's consensus reads, "Timely, solidly acted, and unabashedly earnest, Rosewater serves as an impressive calling card for first-time director Jon Stewart." On Metacritic, the film has a score of 67 out of 100, based on 35 critics, indicating "generally favorable reviews".

References

External links
 
 
 
 
 
 

2014 films
2010s political drama films
American political drama films
2010s English-language films
Drama films based on actual events
Films based on memoirs
Films set in 1980
Films set in 2009
Films set in London
Films set in Tehran
Films shot in Jordan
American independent films
Political films based on actual events
Open Road Films films
Busboy Productions
Films produced by Scott Rudin
Films directed by Jon Stewart
2014 directorial debut films
2014 drama films
Films scored by Howard Shore
2010s American films